Diego Méndez Molero (born 29 August 2003) is a Spanish professional footballer who plays as a defensive midfielder for Rayo Vallecano B.

Career
A youth product of Rayo Vallecano, he began his senior career with their reserves in 2021 before signing a professional contract in the summer of 2022. He made his professional debut with the senior Rayo Vallecano team in a 3–1 Copa del Rey win over Mollerussa on 13 November 2022, scoring his side's second goal in the 51st minute. He was promoted to their senior team in December 2022.

References

External links
 
 
 

2003 births
Living people
People from Móstoles
Spanish footballers
Association football midfielders
Rayo Vallecano players
Rayo Vallecano B players
La Liga players
Tercera Federación players